Albin Eriksson (born 20 July 2000) is a Swedish ice hockey winger who is currently playing with the BIK Karlskoga in the HockeyAllsvenskan (Allsv). Eriksson was selected in the second round, 44th overall, of the 2018 NHL Entry Draft by the Dallas Stars.

Playing career
Eriksson made his Swedish Hockey League debut playing with Skellefteå AIK during the 2017–18 SHL season.

In his third season within Skellefteå AIK's squad in the 2019–20 season, Erikdsson was loaned for a month as an injury replacement to Modo Hockey of the HockeyAllsvenskan on 14 November 2019. Eriksson made just 3 appearances during his time with Modo before returning to Skellefteå AIK. Registering 2 assists in 17 games, Eriksson left SAIK and transferred to fellow SHL club Färjestad BK, signing a two-year contract, on 22 January 2020. He added 1 assist in 12 further games before the season was cancelled due to COVID-19.

Career statistics

Regular season and playoffs

International

References

External links

2000 births
Living people
Ässät players
BIK Karlskoga players
Dallas Stars draft picks
Färjestad BK players
Ilves players
Modo Hockey players
People from Bollnäs
Skellefteå AIK players
Sportspeople from Gävleborg County
Swedish ice hockey forwards